Pandaveswar Colloge, established in 2005, is the general degree college in Pandaveswar, Paschim Bardhaman district in India. It offers undergraduate courses in arts. It is affiliated to Kazi Nazrul University, Asansol.

Departments

Arts

Bengali
English
History
Sociology

Accreditation
The college is recognized by the University Grants Commission (UGC).

See also

References

External links
Kazi Nazrul University
University Grants Commission
National Assessment and Accreditation Council

Universities and colleges in Paschim Bardhaman district
Colleges affiliated to Kazi Nazrul University
Educational institutions established in 2005
2005 establishments in West Bengal